The Pratt & Whitney F119, company designation PW5000, is an afterburning turbofan engine developed by Pratt & Whitney for the Advanced Tactical Fighter (ATF) program, which resulted in the Lockheed Martin F-22 Raptor. The engine delivers thrust in the  class and was designed for sustained supersonic flight without afterburners, or supercruise. Delivering almost 22% more thrust with 40% fewer parts than its F100 predecessor, the F119 allows the F-22 to achieve supercruise speeds of up to Mach 1.8. The F119's nozzles incorporate thrust vectoring that enable them to direct the engine thrust ±20° in the pitch axis to give the F-22 enhanced maneuverability.

The F119 is also the basis for the Joint Strike Fighter (JSF) propulsion system, with variants powering both the Boeing X-32 and Lockheed Martin X-35 concept demonstrators.

History
The F119 resulted from the Joint Advanced Fighter Engine (JAFE) program in the early 1980s aimed at supplying the powerplant for the Air Force's Advanced Tactical Fighter (ATF). Detailed design of Pratt & Whitney's submission, designated internally as PW5000, began when the request for proposals (RFP) for JAFE, later renamed ATF Engine, was released in May 1983. Advances in engine technology, such as those from the Advanced Turbine Engine Gas Generator (ATEGG) and the Joint Technology Demonstration Engine (JTDE) programs, allowed the design to do more work with fewer stages, with the PW5000's compressor having only 6 stages compared to the 10 stages in the F100's compressor. The high pressure and low pressure turbines were single stage and counter-rotating, which reduced the gyroscopic forces on the engine; it was hoped that counter-rotation would eliminate a row of turbine stators, which would save weight and reduce parts count, but this was ultimately not successful and the stators were retained. The fan and compressor stages were to use integrally bladed rotors (IBR), also known as blisks, to reduce weight and cost and improve performance. Owing to the ATF’s demanding requirements for supercruise, the PW5000 design has low bypass ratio, high core and turbine inlet temperatures, and a fully variable convergent-divergent nozzle to achieve high specific thrust in intermediate, or non-afterburning power. The combustor, internally named Floatwall, eliminated welds to mitigate crack growth due to thermal cycling.

Pratt & Whitney and General Electric were selected to make prototype engines, designated YF119 and YF120 respectively, for demonstration and validation (Dem/Val). Both engine makers would provide engines for both the Lockheed/Boeing/General Dynamics YF-22 and the Northrop/McDonnell Douglas YF-23 ATF technology and flight demonstrators. Pratt & Whitney's design changed to incorporate a 15% larger fan, increasing bypass ratio from 0.25 to 0.30. However, unlike General Electric, Pratt & Whitney did not fit its larger fan on flightworthy YF119s for the ATF flight demonstrators to avoid potential reliability issues that may arise. Instead, the revised fan was extensively ground tested at Wright-Patterson Air Force Base. As a result, both the YF-22 and YF-23 had lower performance with the YF119s than with the YF120s.

On 3 August 1991, Pratt & Whitney was awarded the EMD contract for ATF engine, while the Lockheed/Boeing/General Dynamics team won the contract for the ATF airframe. While the YF119 was a more conventional design compared to the General Electric's variable cycle YF120, Pratt & Whitney accrued far greater test hours and emphasized reliability and the lower risk. Ground tests of the F119-PW-100 were first conducted in February 1993. The production engines were fitted on the production F-22, and were first flown on the F-22's maiden flight on 7 September 1997. A total of 507 engines were produced. In 2013 Pratt & Whitney assisted the F119 Heavy Maintenance Center (HMC) at Tinker Air Force Base, Oklahoma in the first F119 depot overhaul.

Turbine engine advances from ATEGG and JTDE continued with the Integrated High Performance Turbine Engine Technology (IHPTET) program, with applications in F119 improvement packages and derivatives. Prototype YF119 variants powered the Boeing X-32 and Lockheed Martin X-35 Joint Strike Fighter (JSF) concept demonstrator aircraft, and subsequent full scale development of the F119 derivative resulted in the F135 family of engines that powers the Lockheed Martin F-35 Lightning II.

Design
The F119 is a twin-spool axial-flow low-bypass turbofan. It has a three-stage fan driven by a single-stage low pressure turbine and six-stage high pressure compressor driven by single-stage high pressure turbine. The shroud-less fan has wide-chord, low aspect ratio hollow titanium fan blades that are linear-friction welded to the disks to form single-piece integrally-bladed rotors (IBRs), or blisks. The compressor stators and thrust-vectoring nozzle use a burn-resistant titanium alloy called Alloy C, with the first row of stators variable in order to increase surge margin. The Floatwall annular combustor is lined with high-cobalt material for oxidation resistance and combustion chamber durability, and ensures the clean burning of the fuel and reduced NOx generation. The high-pressure turbine blades are made of single-crystal superalloys and impingement cooled using air from the high-pressure compressor. The high and low pressure spools are counter-rotating. The requirement for the ATF to supercruise, or fly supersonic without afterburners, results in a very low bypass ratio of 0.30 for the F119-PW-100 in order to achieve high specific thrust. The F119 has dual-redundant full authority digital engine control (FADEC), also referred to internally as Digital Electronic Engine Control (DEEC), supplied by Hamilton Standard and fully integrated into the F-22's vehicle management system.

The three-zone afterburner, or augmentor, contributes to the stealth of the aircraft by having fuel injectors integrated into thick curved vanes coated with ceramic radar-absorbent materials (RAM). These vanes replace the traditional fuel spray bars and flame holders and block line-of-sight of the turbines. The convergent-divergent nozzle can vector ±20° in the pitch axis, which greatly improves the aircraft's pitch authority by augmenting the pitching moment of the tail with engine thrust; this enables the F-22 to remain controllable while flying at a trimmed alpha of over 60°. The thrust vectoring is fully integrated into the F-22's flight control system to facilitate handling. The rectangular nozzle consists two wedge-shaped flaps for stealth and also contribute to lower infrared signature by flattening the exhaust plume and facilitating its mixing with ambient air through shed vortices.

The F119 has a design life of 8,650 total accumulated cycles, with overhaul of the hot section approximately every 2,000 hours and the cold section every 4,000 hours.

Prototype variants
While the production F119 on the F-22 incorporates rectangular thrust vectoring nozzles, prototype variants on other aircraft had different nozzle solutions that are tailored to the airframe.

The YF119 on the YF-23 had a single-expansion ramp nozzle (SERN) consisting of a variable wedge flap on the top and a fixed ramp on the bottom, which then transitions to a trench on top of the aft fuselage. While the SERN lacked thrust vectoring capability, it allowed the exhaust to be further cooled in the trenches, significantly reducing infrared signature when viewed from below the aircraft; the trenches in the aft deck were lined with tiles that were “transpiration cooled” from engine bleed air to withstand the heat of the exhaust.

The specialized YF119 variants on the X-32 and X-35 had provisions for short takeoff and vertical landing (STOVL) operations. The YF119-PW-614 on the X-32 had a pitch-axis thrust vectoring nozzle and valves can redirect the engine exhaust and bleed air to provide direct lift, similar to the Pegasus engine on the Harrier. In contrast, YF119-PW-611 on the X-35 had a round axisymmetric nozzle that can swivel downwards while the low-pressure spool drives a lift fan that’s engaged through a clutch; engine bypass air is also routed to roll posts for additional lift and stability. The X-35 won the JSF competition and its shaft-driven lift fan system, called LiftSystem, was fully developed by Rolls-Royce and Pratt & Whitney for the F135-PW-600.

Variants
 YF119-PW-100L: Prototype engine for the YF-22; rated 30,000 lbf thrust class.
 YF119-PW-100N: Prototype engine for the YF-23; rated 30,000 lbf thrust class.
 F119-PW-100: Production engine for the F-22A with larger fan and increased bypass ratio (BPR) rated for 35,000 lbf thrust class.
 YF119-PW-611: Prototype engine for the X-35.
 YF119-PW-614: Prototype engine for the X-32.

Applications
 Boeing X-32 (YF119-PW-614)
 Lockheed YF-22 (YF119-PW-100L)
 Lockheed Martin F-22 Raptor (F119-PW-100)
 Lockheed Martin X-35 (YF119-PW-611)
 Northrop YF-23 (YF119-PW-100N)

Specifications (F119-PW-100)

See also

References

External links

 Pratt & Whitney F119
 F119 page on GlobalSecurity.org

Low-bypass turbofan engines
F119
1990s turbofan engines